Framton is a suburb of Johannesburg, South Africa, just south of the CBD and neighbouring the suburb of Booysens. It is located in Region F of the City of Johannesburg Metropolitan Municipality.

History
The suburb was proclaimed on 11 November 1964 and is named after Morris Herbert Fram.

References

Johannesburg Region F